2,6-Dimethylpiperidines are chemical compounds with the formula C5H8(CH3)2NH.  Three stereoisomers exist: the achiral (R,S)-isomer and the chiral (R,R)/(S,S) enantiomeric pair. Dimethylpiperidines are derivatives of the heterocycle piperidine, wherein two hydrogen atoms are replaced by methyl groups.

The 2,6-dimethylpiperidines are prepared by reduction of 2,6-dimethylpyridine (2,6-lutidine).  The achiral isomer is the predominant isomer produced in this reaction.

The 2,6-dimethylpiperidines are of interest for their conformational properties. The (R,S)-isomer exists largely in the chair conformation with equatorial methyl groups.  The (R,R)/(S,S)-isomers are attractive chiral secondary amine building blocks.

References

See also
Compound Summary 2,6-Dimethylpiperidine on National Library of Medicine National Center 

Piperidines